Representin' is a compilation album by MC Eiht and the re-release of Compton's Most Wanted's Represent by its frontman, MC Eiht. The album was released February 6, 2007.

Track listing
"This Is Compton" - 4:14
"Some May Know" - 4:36
"Get Money" - 4:27
"What You Like It Like" - 4:32
"One Hundred Percent" - 2:43
"Then U Gone" - 3:54
"All Around The Hood" - 3:55
"Them Niggaz" - 3:50
"So Don't Go There" - 4:13
"Representin'" - 2:30
"Like Me" - 4:08
"Slang My Keys" - 4:22
"Livin Like Gangstaz (Bonus track) - 4:35

MC Eiht albums
2007 compilation albums
Gangsta rap compilation albums